Anis Ben Abdallah Aissaoui (born September 23, 1973 in Tunis) is a former Tunisian national professional football player converted into a professional football head coach.He is the current head coach of the Moroccan Football Team Club Rachad Bernoussi.

Professional football player career 
Scouted at the age of 12 years old by the prestigious Tunisian club Club Africain, he joined the Club Africain Academy in 1985.

Youth career
 1985-1991: Club Africain (Tunis,Tunisia)

Professional career
He began his professional career as a professional footballer in 1991 with his Academy Club.

 1991-1994: Club Africain (Tunis,Tunisia)
 1994-1995: AS Gabès (Gabès,Tunisia)
 1995-1999: Mouloudia sportive de La Manouba (La Manouba,Tunisia)
 1999-2002: Union sportive de Djebel Jelloud (Djebel Jelloud,Tunisia)

Professional football head coach career 
Freshly retired from the professional world, he decided to embark on a career as a professional football coach. In 2002, he decided to join the club he revealed to the prestigious Tunisian club Club Africain

 2002-2004: Club Africain (Head Coach of the Youth Teams)
 2004-2005: Club Africain (Head Coach of the Senior U15 Team)
 2005-2006: Club Africain (Head Coach of the Senior U17 Team)
 2006-2007: Club Africain (Head Coach of the Senior U19 Team)
 2007-2008: Club Africain (Head Coach of the Senior U23 Team)
 2008-2011: Jeunesse sportive de La Soukra (Head Coach of the Senior Professional Team)
 2011-2012: Club olympique des transports (Head Coach of the Senior Professional Team)
 2012-2015: Jeunesse sportive de La Soukra (Head Coach of the Senior Professional Team)
 2015-2016: Al-Yarmouk FC Saudi Arabia (Head Coach of the Senior Professional Team)
 2016-2017: Jeunesse sportive de La Soukra (Head Coach of the Senior Professional Team)
 2017-2018: Saudi Baish Club (Head Coach of the Senior Professional Team)
 2018-2019: Rafik Sorman(Head Coach of the Senior Professional Team)
 2019-2020: Al-Adalah FC (Head Coach of the Senior Professional Team)
 2020-2021: Shabaab al Jabal (Head Coach of the Senior Professional Team)
 2021-2022: Darnes SC (Head Coach of the Senior Professional Team)
 2022-: Club Rachad Bernoussi (Head Coach of the Senior Professional Team)

Personal life 
Anis Aissaoui speaks fluently French and Arabic

Honors 
As a Head Coach
 2003-2004: Champion of Tunisia
 2004-2005: Champion of Tunisia
 2005-2006: Champion of Tunisia and Winner of the Cup of Tunisia
 2006-2007: Winner of the Cup of Tunisia
 2013-2014: Promotion to Division One " Tunisian Ligue 2 " and 3rd of the Championship of " Tunisian 3rd Tier Ligue 3 "
 2015-2016: Champion of Jizan Province

References 

Living people
1973 births
Tunisian footballers